The 1970 LFF Lyga was the 49th season of the LFF Lyga football competition in Lithuania.  It was contested by 17 teams, and Atletas Kaunas won the championship.

League standings

References
RSSSF

LFF Lyga seasons
1970 in Lithuania
LFF